James Sydney Cockburn (20 May 1916 – 13 November 1990) was an Australian cricketer. He played in two first-class matches for Queensland in 1936/37.

See also
 List of Queensland first-class cricketers

References

External links
 

1916 births
1990 deaths
Australian cricketers
Queensland cricketers
People from Maryborough, Queensland
Cricketers from Queensland
Australian Army personnel of World War II
Australian Army soldiers